The 1943 Temple Owls football team was an American football team that represented Temple University as an independent during the 1943 college football season. In its fourth season under head coach Ray Morrison, the team compiled a 2–6 record and was outscored by a total of 163 to 65. The team played its home games at Temple Stadium in Philadelphia.

Schedule

References

Temple
Temple Owls football seasons
Temple Owls football